Iida Yrjö-Koskinen ( Petander; 1857—1937) was a Finnish politician, teacher and journalist, who served as a Member of the Parliament of Finland between 1909 and 1919, first representing the Finnish Party and later the National Coalition Party.

Her parliamentary career included the period leading to, and declaring, Finland's independence. She was also an elector in the 1925 Finnish presidential election.

Yrjö-Koskinen trained as a teacher, qualifying in 1879, and working for over 20 years as a teacher, first in Hämeenlinna and later in Tampere. In her later career she worked as a journalist. She dedicated her career to improving women's rights and education, and the welfare of underprivileged people.

In 1884, she married Freiherr , which gave her the noble title of Freiherrin (Finnish: Vapaaherratar).

References

20th-century Finnish politicians
National Coalition Party politicians
Finnish Party politicians
Finnish educators
Finnish journalists
Members of the Parliament of Finland (1909–10)
Members of the Parliament of Finland (1910–11)
Members of the Parliament of Finland (1911–13)
Members of the Parliament of Finland (1913–16)
Members of the Parliament of Finland (1916–17)
Members of the Parliament of Finland (1917–19)
Finnish nobility
People from Kuopio Province (Grand Duchy of Finland)
1857 births
1937 deaths